Strong Tower is a worship album released by the Christian rock group, Kutless and is also their third studio album. An enhanced deluxe edition of this album was released on March 20, 2007, with additional tracks and the "Strong Tower" live music video. The title track of this record, "Strong Tower", was once in the Top 5 on ChristianRock.net. The album peaked at No. 87 on the Billboard 200 and No. 4 on the Billboard Christian Albums. Five years later, in 2010, the album reached the Billboard Catalog Albums chart peaking at No. 39. The album was certified Gold by RIAA in 2009 and is Kutless' best selling album to date. The official music video for "Strong Tower" came out on YouTube on February 27, 2009, included lead singer Jon Micah Sumrall, guitarists James Mead and Nick DePartee, bassist Dave Luetkenhoelter and drummer Jeffrey Gilbert.

Track listing

Personnel 

Kutless
 Jon Micah Sumrall – lead vocals, acoustic guitar
 James Mead – lead guitars, backing vocals
 Ryan Shrout –  rhythm guitars, backing vocals
 Kyle Zeigler – bass guitar
 Kyle Mitchell – drums, percussion

Additional musicians
 Phil Peterson – cello on "Arms of Love" and "Strong Tower"
 Anne-Marie Hunsaker – backing vocals on "Arms of Love"

Production
 Aaron Sprinkle – producer, engineer at Compound Recording, Seattle, Washington
 Austin Thomason – assistant engineer 
 Zach Hodges – additional engineering
 JR McNeely – mixing (1, 2, 3, 4, 7, 8, 10) at Compound Recording, Seattle, Washington
 Skidd Mills – mixing (5, 6, 9, 11, 12. 13) at Compound Recording, Seattle, Washington
 Aaron Mlasko – drum technician
 Brandon Ebel – executive producer and A&R
 Brian Gardner – mastering at Bernie Grundman Mastering, Hollywood, California
 Asterik Studio – art direction and design
 David Stuart – photography

Awards and certifications

The album was nominated for a Dove Award for Praise & Worship Album of the Year at the 37th GMA Dove Awards. The title song was also nominated for Worship Song of the Year.

This album was certified Gold selling more than 500,000 copies

References

Music video

A video that consists of the band playing at night outside of the Lincoln Memorial courthouse building was released.

Kutless albums
BEC Recordings albums
2005 albums
Albums produced by Aaron Sprinkle